Dinesh Agarwal (born 19 February 1969) is an Indian entrepreneur, founder and CEO of IndiaMART, an online B2B marketplace in India.

Early life and education

After completing an engineering degree with a specialization in computer science from Harcourt Butler Technological Institute, Kanpur, he worked with several firms.

Early career

Dinesh first started working at CMC (now part of TCS) where he worked on the first Railway reservation system and later joined Sam Pitroda and his team at the Center for Development of Telematics to develop an indigenous digital telephone exchange for India.

In 1992, Dinesh moved to HCL in the US, to set up offices on the East Coast. There he saw the birth of the internet in America, realized the potential of the internet and the impact it could have on Indian masses.

1995 and after

In August 1995, he resigned from HCl, returned to India with his wife and child, and started looking for internet related opportunities to become an internet entrepreneur.

Agarwal decided to make a website that would be an online marketplace for exporters and importers. India had around 15,000 internet users at that time. When he did not receive government permission to get the directories of exporters and sellers online, he decided to have a free listing form and sent it to all the sellers in the directories. "My whole family, including my mother and wife, would help with the mailers.”IndiaMART's first tagline was:  'The global gateway to Indian marketplace'.

In 2007-2008 when recession hit the US, Agarwal and his cousin Brijesh decided to pivot the focus from export oriented business to India-focused B2B market and raised $10 million from Intel Capital.

Other domain ventures by Agarwal include www.indiangiftsportal.com and www.abcpayments.com. He later became an investor, providing funding to Tolexo, and Innerchef, a Gurgaon-based ready-to-eat and ready-to-cook meals delivery startup.

An Angel Investor
Dinesh Agarwal has turned into a big-time investor in recent years, putting in money in a number of start-ups. His portfolio includes companies such as medical app Curofy, crowdfunding platform Wishberry, marketing platform SilverPush, fintech startup MoneyyApp, food tech start-up InnerChef, developer startup AppVirality and others.

Awards and recognition
 He has been recognized by various media houses and industry associations for his contribution to the Indian business environs. He has been recognized by CNBC as a Young Turk, and as The Market Maker by The Economic Times.

References

External links
 

Indian business executives
Living people
Place of birth missing (living people)
1969 births